Thierry Neuvic (born 3 August 1970) is a French actor. He has appeared in more than 50 films and television shows since 1996. He starred in the film Code Unknown, which was selected in the 2000 Cannes Film Festival.

Personal life
He was the companion of actress Hélène Fillières for several years until October 2011.

Theater

Filmography

Award 
 Festival de Luchon 2019 : Best actor for Illégitime

References

External links

1970 births
Living people
French male film actors
French male television actors
People from Montreuil, Seine-Saint-Denis
Cours Florent alumni
20th-century French male actors
21st-century French male actors
French male stage actors